Fred Donald Marion (born January 2, 1959), is an American former professional football player who was a safety in the National Football League (NFL) for ten seasons during the 1980s and 1990s.  Marion played college football for the Miami Hurricanes, and was recognized as an All-American.  Marion played professionally for the NFL's New England Patriots.

Early life and education
Marion was born in Gainesville, Florida.

He attended the University of Miami in Coral Gables, Florida, where he played for the Hurricanes from 1978 to 1981.  As a senior in 1981, he was a consensus first-team All-American.

Career
He was a Pro Bowl selection in 1985 when he intercepted seven passes for 189 return yards, helping the Patriots to their first Super Bowl appearance versus the Chicago Bears.

His only career touchdown came in 1986 against Pittsburgh.  He intercepted Bubby Brister and ran back a 37-yard score.

References

1959 births
Living people
All-American college football players
American Conference Pro Bowl players
American football safeties
American football cornerbacks
Miami Hurricanes football players
New England Patriots players
Players of American football from Gainesville, Florida
Ed Block Courage Award recipients